Nemacladus is a genus of flowering plants in the bellflower family known generally as threadplants. Species are native to the southwestern United States and northern Mexico. These are annual herbs with very slender, sometimes threadlike, branching stems bearing small five-lobed flowers.

Taxonomy
The genus was erected by Thomas Nuttall in 1842. It is placed in the small subfamily Nemacladoideae of the family Campanulaceae.

Species
, Plants of the World Online accepted the following species:

Nemacladus australis (Munz) Morin - Baja California
Nemacladus bellus Morin & T.J.Ayers
Nemacladus breviflorus (McVaugh) Morin & T.J.Ayers
Nemacladus calcaratus Morin - Chimney Creek threadplant - California (Inyo + Tulare Cos)
Nemacladus californicus (A.Gray) Morin - California (San Bernardino, Kern, Ventura, Santa Barbara, San Luis Obispo Cos)
Nemacladus capillaris Greene - much of California, southwestern Oregon
Nemacladus eastwoodiae Morin & T.J.Ayers
Nemacladus glanduliferus Jeps.  - glandular threadplant - Arizona, southern California, Baja California 
Nemacladus gracilis Eastw. - slender threadplant  - California (San Joaquin Valley, Los Angeles Basin)
Nemacladus interior (Munz) G.T.Robbins - Sierra threadplant - California, Oregon
Nemacladus inyoensis Morin & T.J.Ayers
Nemacladus longiflorus A.Gray - California, Arizona, Utah, Baja California
Nemacladus matsonii Morin & T.J.Ayers
Nemacladus montanus Greene - northern California
Nemacladus morefieldii Morin & T.J.Ayers
Nemacladus orientalis (McVaugh) Morin - Sonora, Baja California, California, Arizona, Nevada, Utah, southern New Mexico, extreme western Texas
Nemacladus parikhiae Morin & T.J.Ayers
Nemacladus pinnatifidus Greene - Baja California, southern California
Nemacladus ramosissimus Nutt. - smallflower threadplant - Baja California, southern California
Nemacladus richardsiae Morin & T.J.Ayers
Nemacladus rigidus Curran - stoutstem threadplant - California, Nevada, southeastern Oregon, southwestern Idaho
Nemacladus rubescens Greene - California, Nevada, western Arizona, southwestern Utah
Nemacladus secundiflorus G.T.Robbins - California
Nemacladus sigmoideus  G.T.Robbins - sigmoid threadplant - California, Nevada, western Arizona
Nemacladus tenuis (McVaugh) Morin - California, Baja California
Nemacladus twisselmannii  J.T.Howell - California (Kern Co.)

References

External links 
 Jepson Manual Genus Treatment
 USDA Plants Profile

Campanulaceae
Campanulaceae genera
Flora of North America